Goweroconcha wenda, also known as the pale-zigzag pinwheel snail, is a species of air-breathing land snail, a terrestrial pulmonate gastropod mollusc in the pinwheel snail family, that is endemic to Australia's Lord Howe Island in the Tasman Sea.

Description
The shell of the snail is 1.9–2.4 mm in height, with a diameter of 4.2–4.5 mm. The colour is pale golden-brown with faint cream flammulations (flame-like markings) on some individuals. The shape is discoidal with a flat to slightly sunken spire, rounded whorls, impressed sutures, and with prominent, sinuous, moderately widely-spaced radial ribs. The umbilicus is widely open. The aperture is roundly lunate, angulate at base. The animal is unknown.

Distribution and habitat
This very rare snail has been recorded on the island from Little Slope and the summit of Mount Gower.

References

 
 

 
wenda
Gastropods of Lord Howe Island
Taxa named by Tom Iredale
Gastropods described in 1944